Coonamble was an electoral district of the Legislative Assembly in the Australian state of New South Wales from 1894 to 1904, named after Coonamble.  It was partly replaced by Castlereagh.

Members for Coonamble

Coonamble
Coonamble
Coonamble
1894 establishments in Australia
1904 disestablishments in Australia